Inet-TV is a South Korean television channel created in October 2001.

Channel number (Korea) 
skylife= SD:273, HD:33
sk b TV= 254
lg u+ TV= 
kt olleh TV= 92

References

Television networks in South Korea
Television channels and stations established in 2001